How the West Was Won is the debut solo studio album by English rock musician Peter Perrett, released on 30 June 2017 by Domino. It was mainly produced by Chris Kimsey with Peter Perrett and his son Jamie producing the title track. Two music videos were produced for the album: "How the West Was Won" and "An Epic Story".

Track listing

References

External links

2017 debut albums
Domino Recording Company albums
Albums produced by Chris Kimsey